Songs and arias by Johann Sebastian Bach are compositions listed in Chapter 6 of the Bach-Werke-Verzeichnis (BWV 439–524), which also includes the Quodlibet. Most of the songs and arias included in this list are set for voice and continuo. Most of them are also spiritual, i.e. hymn settings, although a few have a worldly theme. The best known of these, "Bist du bei mir", was however not composed by Bach.

An aria by Bach was rediscovered in the 21st century, and was assigned the number BWV 1127. Further hymn settings and arias by Bach are included in his cantatas, motets, masses, passions, oratorios and chorale harmonisations (BWV 1–438 and later additions). The second Anhang of the BWV catalogue also lists a few songs of doubtful authenticity.

Songs, arias and Quodlibet, BWV 439–524

|- style="background: #E3F6CE;"
| data-sort-value="0439.000" | 439
| data-sort-value="304.003" | 6.
| data-sort-value="1735-12-31" | 1735–1736 or earlier
| song "Ach, dass nicht die letzte Stunde" (Schemelli #831; tune #56)
| 
| V Bc
| data-sort-value="000.39: 279a" | 39: 279
| data-sort-value="III/02 1: 256" | III/2.1: 210
| ↔ Z 6721; text by Neumeister
| 
|- style="background: #E3F6CE;"
| data-sort-value="0440.000" | 440
| data-sort-value="304.004" | 6.
| data-sort-value="1735-12-31" | 1735–1736 or earlier
| song "Auf, auf! die rechte Zeit ist hier" (Schemelli #171; tune #11)
| 
| V Bc
| data-sort-value="000.39: 279b" | 39: 279
| data-sort-value="III/02 1: 211" | III/2.1: 123
| data-sort-value="↔ Z 0705" | ↔ Z 705; text by Opitz
| 
|- style="background: #E3F6CE;"
| data-sort-value="0441.000" rowspan="2" | 441
| data-sort-value="304.005" rowspan="2" | 6.
| data-sort-value="1730-01-01" |  or earlier
| chorale setting "Auf, auf, mein Herz, mit Freuden"
| rowspan="2" | F maj.
| SATB
| 
| data-sort-value="III/02 1: 095" | III/2.1: 67
| rowspan="2" | after Z 5243; text by Gerhardt
| rowspan="2" | 
|- style="background: #E3F6CE;"
| data-sort-value="1735-12-31" | 1735–1736 or earlier
| song "Auf, auf, mein Herz, mit Freuden" (Schemelli #320; tune #27)
| V Bc
| data-sort-value="000.39: 279c" | 39: 279
| data-sort-value="III/02 1: 227" | III/2.1: 152
|- style="background: #E3F6CE;"
| data-sort-value="0442.000" | 442
| data-sort-value="304.006" | 6.
| data-sort-value="1735-12-31" | 1735–1736 or earlier
| song "Beglückter Stand getreuer Seelen" (Schemelli #570; tune #39)
| 
| V Bc
| data-sort-value="000.39: 280a" | 39: 280
| data-sort-value="III/02 1: 239" | III/2.1: 176
| after Z 5970; text by 
| 
|- style="background: #E3F6CE;"
| data-sort-value="0443.000" | 443
| data-sort-value="304.007" | 6.
| data-sort-value="1735-12-31" | 1735–1736 or earlier
| song "Beschränkt, ihr Weisen dieser Welt" (Schemelli #689; tune #47)
| 
| V Bc
| data-sort-value="000.39: 280b" | 39: 280
| data-sort-value="III/02 1: 247" | III/2.1: 192
| ↔ Z 7765; text by 
| 
|- style="background: #E3F6CE;"
| data-sort-value="0444.000" | 444
| data-sort-value="304.008" | 6.
| data-sort-value="1735-12-31" | 1735–1736 or earlier
| song "Brich entzwei, mein armes Herze" (Schemelli #303; tune #24)
| 
| V Bc
| data-sort-value="000.39: 280c" | 39: 280
| data-sort-value="III/02 1: 224" | III/2.1: 146
| after Z 7110–7111a; → Z 7111b; text by 
| 
|- style="background: #E3F6CE;"
| data-sort-value="0445.000" | 445
| data-sort-value="304.009" | 6.
| data-sort-value="1735-12-31" | 1735–1736 or earlier
| song "Brunnquell aller Güter" (Schemelli #335; tune #29)
| 
| V Bc
| data-sort-value="000.39: 281a" | 39: 281
| data-sort-value="III/02 1: 229" | III/2.1: 156
| after Z 6252b; text by Franck, J.
| 
|- style="background: #E3F6CE;"
| data-sort-value="0446.000" | 446
| data-sort-value="304.010" | 6.
| data-sort-value="1735-12-31" | 1735–1736 or earlier
| song "Der lieben Sonnen Licht und Pracht" (Schemelli #39; tune #2)
| 
| V Bc
| data-sort-value="000.39: 281b" | 39: 281
| data-sort-value="III/02 1: 202" | III/2.1: 106
| after Z 5659; text by Scriver
| 
|- style="background: #E3F6CE;"
| data-sort-value="0447.000" | 447
| data-sort-value="304.011" | 6.
| data-sort-value="1735-12-31" | 1735–1736 or earlier
| song "Der Tag ist hin, die Sonne gehet nieder" (Schemelli #40; tune #3)
| 
| V Bc
| data-sort-value="000.39: 281c" | 39: 281
| data-sort-value="III/02 1: 203" | III/2.1: 108
| data-sort-value="after Z 0923; ↔ BWV 297" | after Z 923; ↔ BWV 297; text by 
| 
|- style="background: #E3F6CE;"
| data-sort-value="0448.000" | 448
| data-sort-value="304.012" | 6.
| data-sort-value="1735-12-31" | 1735–1736 or earlier
| song "Der Tag mit seinem Lichte" (Schemelli #43; tune #4)
| 
| V Bc
| data-sort-value="000.39: 282a" | 39: 282
| data-sort-value="III/02 1: 204" | III/2.1: 110
| after Z 7512b; text by Gerhardt
| 
|- style="background: #E3F6CE;"
| data-sort-value="0449.000" | 449
| data-sort-value="305.001" | 6.
| data-sort-value="1735-12-31" | 1735–1736 or earlier
| song "Dich bet ich an, mein höchster Gott" (Schemelli #396; tune #31)
| 
| V Bc
| data-sort-value="000.39: 282b" | 39: 282
| data-sort-value="III/02 1: 231" | III/2.1: 160
| ↔ Z 2437; text by 
| 
|- style="background: #E3F6CE;"
| data-sort-value="0450.000" | 450
| data-sort-value="305.002" | 6.
| data-sort-value="1735-12-31" | 1735–1736 or earlier
| song "Die bittre Leidenszeit beginnet abermal" (Schemelli #258; tune #17)
| 
| V Bc
| data-sort-value="000.39: 282c" | 39: 282
| data-sort-value="III/02 1: 217" | III/2.1: 134
| after Z 7429; text by 
| 
|- id="Schemellis Gesangbuch No. 13" style="background: #E3F6CE;"
| data-sort-value="0451.000" | 451
| data-sort-value="305.003" | 6.
| data-sort-value="1735-12-31" | 1735–1736 or earlier
| song "Die güldne Sonne" (Schemelli #13; tune #1)
| 
| V Bc
| data-sort-value="000.39: 283" | 39: 283
| data-sort-value="III/02 1: 201" | III/2.1: 104
| after Z 8015; text by Gerhardt
| 
|- style="background: #E3F6CE;"
| data-sort-value="0452.000" | 452
| data-sort-value="305.004" | 6.
| data-sort-value="1735-12-31" | 1735–1736 or earlier
| song "Dir, dir, Jehova, will ich singen" (Schemelli #397; tune #32)
| 
| V Bc
| data-sort-value="000.39: 284a" | 39: 284
| data-sort-value="III/02 1: 232" | III/2.1: 162
| data-sort-value="after BWV 0299" | after BWV 299; → Z 3068; text by Crasselius
| 
|- style="background: #E3F6CE;"
| data-sort-value="0453.000" | 453
| data-sort-value="305.005" | 6.
| data-sort-value="1735-12-31" | 1735–1736 or earlier
| song "Eins ist not! ach Herr, dies Eine" (Schemelli #112; tune #7)
| 
| V Bc
| data-sort-value="000.39: 284b" | 39: 284
| data-sort-value="III/02 1: 207" | III/2.1: 116
| ↔ Z 7129; text by 
| 
|- style="background: #E3F6CE;"
| data-sort-value="0454.000" | 454
| data-sort-value="305.006" | 6.
| data-sort-value="1735-12-31" | 1735–1736 or earlier
| song "Ermuntre dich, mein schwacher Geist" (Schemelli #187; tune #12)
| 
| V Bc
| data-sort-value="000.39: 284c" | 39: 284
| data-sort-value="III/02 1: 212" | III/2.1: 124
| after Z 5741; text by Rist
| 
|- style="background: #E3F6CE;"
| data-sort-value="0455.000" | 455
| data-sort-value="305.007" | 6.
| data-sort-value="1735-12-31" | 1735–1736 or earlier
| song "Erwürgtes Lamm, das die verwahrten Siegel" (Schemelli #580; tune #43)
| 
| V Bc
| data-sort-value="000.39: 285a" | 39: 285
| data-sort-value="III/02 1: 243" | III/2.1: 184
| after Z 3138; text by 
| 
|- style="background: #E3F6CE;"
| data-sort-value="0456.000" | 456
| data-sort-value="305.008" | 6.
| data-sort-value="1735-12-31" | 1735–1736 or earlier
| song "Es glänzet der Christen inwendiges Leben" (Schemelli #572; tune #40)
| 
| V Bc
| data-sort-value="000.39: 285b" | 39: 285
| data-sort-value="III/02 1: 240" | III/2.1: 178
| after Z 6969; text by Richter
| 
|- style="background: #E3F6CE;"
| data-sort-value="0457.000" | 457
| data-sort-value="305.009" | 6.
| data-sort-value="1735-12-31" | 1735–1736 or earlier
| song "Es ist nun aus mit meinem Leben" (Schemelli #847; tune #57)
| 
| V Bc
| data-sort-value="000.39: 286a" | 39: 286
| data-sort-value="III/02 1: 257" | III/2.1: 212
| after Z 6969; text by 
| 
|- style="background: #E3F6CE;"
| data-sort-value="0458.000" | 458
| data-sort-value="305.010" | 6.
| data-sort-value="1735-12-31" | 1735–1736 or earlier
| song "Es ist vollbracht! Vergiss ja nicht dies Wort" (Schemelli #306; tune #25)
| 
| V Bc
| data-sort-value="000.39: 286b" | 39: 286
| data-sort-value="III/02 1: 225" | III/2.1: 148
| after Z 2692; text by 
| 
|- style="background: #E3F6CE;"
| data-sort-value="0459.000" | 459
| data-sort-value="305.011" | 6.
| data-sort-value="1735-12-31" | 1735–1736 or earlier
| song "Es kostet viel, ein Christ zu sein" (Schemelli #522; tune #38)
| 
| V Bc
| data-sort-value="000.39: 286c" | 39: 286
| data-sort-value="III/02 1: 238" | III/2.1: 174
| after Z 2727; text by Richter
| 
|- style="background: #E3F6CE;"
| data-sort-value="0460.000" | 460
| data-sort-value="305.012" | 6.
| data-sort-value="1735-12-31" | 1735–1736 or earlier
| song "Gib dich zufrieden und sei stille" (Schemelli #647; tune #45)
| 
| V Bc
| data-sort-value="000.39: 288a" | 39: 288
| data-sort-value="III/02 1: 245" | III/2.1: 188
| after Z 7415; text by Gerhardt
| 
|- style="background: #E3F6CE;"
| data-sort-value="0461.000" | 461
| data-sort-value="305.013" | 6.
| data-sort-value="1735-12-31" | 1735–1736 or earlier
| song "Gott lebet noch" (Schemelli #488; tune #37)
| 
| V Bc
| data-sort-value="000.39: 288b" | 39: 288
| data-sort-value="III/02 1: 237" | III/2.1: 172
| after Z 7951; ↔ BWV 320; text by 
| 
|- style="background: #E3F6CE;"
| data-sort-value="0462.000" | 462
| data-sort-value="305.014" | 6.
| data-sort-value="1735-12-31" | 1735–1736 or earlier
| song "Gott wie groß ist deine Güte" (Schemelli #360; tune #30)
| 
| V Bc
| data-sort-value="000.39: 289a" | 39: 289
| data-sort-value="III/02 1: 230" | III/2.1: 158
| text by Schemelli; → Z 7937
| 
|- style="background: #E3F6CE;"
| data-sort-value="0463.000" | 463
| data-sort-value="305.015" | 6.
| data-sort-value="1735-12-31" | 1735–1736 or earlier
| song "Herr, nicht schicke deine Rache" (Schemelli #78; tune #5)
| 
| V Bc
| data-sort-value="000.39: 289b" | 39: 289
| data-sort-value="III/02 1: 205" | III/2.1: 112
| after Z 6863; text by Opitz
| 
|- style="background: #E3F6CE;"
| data-sort-value="0464.000" | 464
| data-sort-value="305.016" | 6.
| data-sort-value="1735-12-31" | 1735–1736 or earlier
| song "Ich bin ja, Herr, in deiner Macht" (Schemelli #861; tune #58)
| 
| V Bc
| data-sort-value="000.39: 290a" | 39: 290
| data-sort-value="III/02 1: 258" | III/2.1: 214
| after Z 5869a; text by Dach
| 
|- style="background: #E3F6CE;"
| data-sort-value="0465.000" | 465
| data-sort-value="306.001" | 6.
| data-sort-value="1735-12-31" | 1735–1736 or earlier
| song "Ich freue mich in dir" (Schemelli #194; tune #13)
| 
| V Bc
| data-sort-value="000.39: 290b" | 39: 290
| data-sort-value="III/02 1: 213" | III/2.1: 126
| after Z 5138; text by Ziegler, C.
| 
|- style="background: #E3F6CE;"
| data-sort-value="0466.000" | 466
| data-sort-value="306.002" | 6.
| data-sort-value="1735-12-31" | 1735–1736 or earlier
| song "Ich halte treulich still" (Schemelli #657; tune #46)
| 
| V Bc
| data-sort-value="000.39: 290c" | 39: 290
| data-sort-value="III/02 1: 246" | III/2.1: 190
| 
|- style="background: #E3F6CE;"
| data-sort-value="0467.000" | 467
| data-sort-value="306.003" | 6.
| data-sort-value="1735-12-31" | 1735–1736 or earlier
| song "Ich lass dich nicht" (Schemelli #734; tune #51)
| 
| V Bc
| data-sort-value="000.39: 291a" | 39: 291
| data-sort-value="III/02 1: 251" | III/2.1: 200
| after Z 7455; text by 
| 
|- style="background: #E3F6CE;"
| data-sort-value="0468.000" | 468
| data-sort-value="306.004" | 6.
| data-sort-value="1735-12-31" | 1735–1736 or earlier
| song "Ich liebe Jesum alle Stund" (Schemelli #737; tune #52)
| 
| V Bc
| data-sort-value="000.39: 291b" | 39: 291
| data-sort-value="III/02 1: 252" | III/2.1: 202
| after Z 4731; → Z 4732
| 
|- style="background: #E3F6CE;"
| data-sort-value="0469.000" | 469
| data-sort-value="306.005" | 6.
| data-sort-value="1735-12-31" | 1735–1736 or earlier
| song "Ich steh an deiner Krippen hier" (Schemelli #195; tune #14)
| 
| V Bc
| data-sort-value="000.39: 292a" | 39: 292
| data-sort-value="III/02 1: 214" | III/2.1: 128
| ↔ Z 4663; text by Gerhardt
| 
|- style="background: #E3F6CE;"
| data-sort-value="0476.000" | 476
| data-sort-value="306.016" | 6.
| data-sort-value="1735-12-31" | 1735–1736 or earlier
| song "Ihr Gestirn, ihr hohlen Lüfte" (Schemelli #197; tune #15)
| 
| V Bc
| data-sort-value="000.39: 294b" | 39: 294
| data-sort-value="III/02 1: 215" | III/2.1: 130
| after Z 3703; text by Franck, J.
| 
|- style="background: #E3F6CE;"
| data-sort-value="0471.000" | 471
| data-sort-value="306.021" | 6.
| data-sort-value="1735-12-31" | 1735–1736 or earlier
| song "Jesu, deine Liebeswunden" (Schemelli #139; tune #10)
| 
| V Bc
| data-sort-value="000.39: 292c" | 39: 292
| data-sort-value="III/02 1: 210" | III/2.1: 122
| text by ?; → Z 1302
| 
|- style="background: #E3F6CE;"
| data-sort-value="0470.000" | 470
| data-sort-value="306.022" | 6.
| data-sort-value="1735-12-31" | 1735–1736 or earlier
| song "Jesu, Jesu, du bist mein" (Schemelli #741; tune #53)
| 
| V Bc
| data-sort-value="000.39: 292b" | 39: 292
| data-sort-value="III/02 1: 253" | III/2.1: 204
| data-sort-value="↔ BWV 0357" | ↔ BWV 357; → Z 6446 
| 
|- style="background: #E3F6CE;"
| data-sort-value="0472.000" | 472
| data-sort-value="306.032" | 6.
| data-sort-value="1735-12-31" | 1735–1736 or earlier
| song "Jesu, meines Glaubens Zier" (Schemelli #119; tune #8)
| 
| V Bc
| data-sort-value="000.39: 293a" | 39: 293
| data-sort-value="III/02 1: 208" | III/2.1: 118
| after Z 6453; text by Sacer
| 
|- style="background: #E3F6CE;"
| data-sort-value="0473.000" | 473
| data-sort-value="306.033" | 6.
| data-sort-value="1735-12-31" | 1735–1736 or earlier
| song "Jesu, meines Herzens Freud" (Schemelli #696; tune #48)
| 
| V Bc
| data-sort-value="000.39: 293b" | 39: 293
| data-sort-value="III/02 1: 248" | III/2.1: 194
| after Z 4797–4798; text by 
| 
|- style="background: #E3F6CE;"
| data-sort-value="0474.000" | 474
| data-sort-value="306.034" | 6.
| data-sort-value="1735-12-31" | 1735–1736 or earlier
| song "Jesus ist das schönste Licht" (Schemelli #463; tune #33)
| 
| V Bc
| data-sort-value="000.39: 293c" | 39: 293
| data-sort-value="III/02 1: 233" | III/2.1: 164
| after Z 6412; text by Richter
| 
|- style="background: #E3F6CE;"
| data-sort-value="0475.000" | 475
| data-sort-value="306.035" | 6.
| data-sort-value="1735-12-31" | 1735–1736 or earlier
| song "Jesus, unser Trost und Leben" (Schemelli #333; tune #28)
| 
| V Bc
| data-sort-value="000.39: 294a" | 39: 294
| data-sort-value="III/02 1: 228" | III/2.1: 154
| after Z 4918; text by 
| 
|- style="background: #E3F6CE;"
| data-sort-value="0477.000" | 477
| data-sort-value="306.037" | 6.
| data-sort-value="1735-12-31" | 1735–1736 or earlier
| song "Kein Stündlein geht dahin" (Schemelli #869; tune #60)
| 
| V Bc
| data-sort-value="000.39: 294c" | 39: 294
| data-sort-value="III/02 1: 260" | III/2.1: 218
| after 4243b; text by Franck, M.?
| 
|- style="background: #E3F6CE;"
| data-sort-value="0478.000" | 478
| data-sort-value="306.038" | 6.
| data-sort-value="1735-12-31" | 1735–1736 or earlier
| song "Komm, süßer Tod" (Schemelli #868; tune #59)
| 
| V Bc
| data-sort-value="000.39: 295a" | 39: 295
| data-sort-value="III/02 1: 259" | III/2.1: 216
| → Z 4400
| 
|- style="background: #E3F6CE;"
| data-sort-value="0479.000" | 479
| data-sort-value="306.039" | 6.
| data-sort-value="1735-12-31" | 1735–1736 or earlier
| song "Kommt, Seelen, dieser Tag" (Schemelli #936; tune #67)
| 
| V Bc
| data-sort-value="000.39: 295b" | 39: 295
| data-sort-value="III/02 1: 267" | III/2.1: 232
| → Z 5185; text by Löscher
| 
|- style="background: #E3F6CE;"
| data-sort-value="0480.000" | 480
| data-sort-value="306.040" | 6.
| data-sort-value="1735-12-31" | 1735–1736 or earlier
| song "Kommt wieder aus der finstern Gruft" (Schemelli #938; tune #68)
| 
| V Bc
| data-sort-value="000.39: 296a" | 39: 296
| data-sort-value="III/02 1: 268" | III/2.1: 234
| → Z 4709; text by Löscher
| 
|- style="background: #E3F6CE;"
| data-sort-value="0481.000" | 481
| data-sort-value="306.041" | 6.
| data-sort-value="1735-12-31" | 1735–1736 or earlier
| song "Lasset uns mit Jesu ziehen" (Schemelli #281; tune #18)
| 
| V Bc
| data-sort-value="000.39: 296b" | 39: 296
| data-sort-value="III/02 1: 218" | III/2.1: 136
| after Z 7886b; ↔ BWV 413; text by Birken
| 
|- style="background: #E3F6CE;"
| data-sort-value="0482.000" | 482
| data-sort-value="307.002" | 6.
| data-sort-value="1735-12-31" | 1735–1736 or earlier
| song "Liebes Herz, bedenke doch" (Schemelli #467; tune #34)
| 
| V Bc
| data-sort-value="000.39: 297a" | 39: 297
| data-sort-value="III/02 1: 234" | III/2.1: 166
| after Z 6434; text by 
| 
|- style="background: #E3F6CE;"
| data-sort-value="0483.000" | 483
| data-sort-value="307.003" | 6.
| data-sort-value="1735-12-31" | 1735–1736 or earlier
| song "Liebster Gott, wann werd ich sterben" (Schemelli #873; tune #61)
| E♭ maj.
| V Bc
| data-sort-value="000.39: 297b" | 39: 297
| data-sort-value="III/02 1: 261" | III/2.1: 220
| after Z 6634; text by Neumann
| 
|- style="background: #E3F6CE;"
| data-sort-value="0484.000" | 484
| data-sort-value="307.004" | 6.
| data-sort-value="1735-12-31" | 1735–1736 or earlier
| song "Liebster Herr Jesu, wo bleibst du so lange" (Schemelli #874; tune #62)
| 
| V Bc
| data-sort-value="000.39: 298a" | 39: 298
| data-sort-value="III/02 1: 262" | III/2.1: 222
| ↔ Z 3969; text by 
| 
|- style="background: #E3F6CE;"
| data-sort-value="0485.000" | 485
| data-sort-value="307.005" | 6.
| data-sort-value="1735-12-31" | 1735–1736 or earlier
| song "Liebster Immanuel, Herzog der Frommen" (Schemelli #761; tune #54)
| 
| V Bc
| data-sort-value="000.39: 298b" | 39: 298
| data-sort-value="III/02 1: 254" | III/2.1: 206
| after Z 4932c; text by Fritsch
| 
|- style="background: #E3F6CE;"
| data-sort-value="0488.000" | 488
| data-sort-value="307.008" | 6.
| data-sort-value="1735-12-31" | 1735–1736 or earlier
| song "Meines Lebens letzte Zeit" (Schemelli #881; tune #63)
| 
| V Bc
| data-sort-value="000.39: 299b" | 39: 299
| data-sort-value="III/02 1: 263" | III/2.1: 224
| after Z 6380; ↔ BWV 381
| 
|- style="background: #E3F6CE;"
| data-sort-value="0486.000" | 486
| data-sort-value="307.016" | 6.
| data-sort-value="1735-12-31" | 1735–1736 or earlier
| song "Mein Jesu, dem die Seraphinen" (Schemelli #121; tune #9)
| 
| V Bc
| data-sort-value="000.39: 298c" | 39: 298
| data-sort-value="III/02 1: 209" | III/2.1: 120
| after Z 5988; text by 
| 
|- style="background: #E3F6CE;"
| data-sort-value="0487.000" | 487
| data-sort-value="307.017" | 6.
| data-sort-value="1735-12-31" | 1735–1736 or earlier
| song "Mein Jesu! was vor Seelenweh" (Schemelli #283; tune #19)
| 
| V Bc
| data-sort-value="000.39: 299a" | 39: 299
| data-sort-value="III/02 1: 219" | III/2.1: 138
| text by Schemelli?; → Z 8383
| 
|- style="background: #E3F6CE;"
| data-sort-value="0489.000" | 489
| data-sort-value="307.019" | 6.
| data-sort-value="1735-12-31" | 1735–1736 or earlier
| song "Nicht so traurig, nicht so sehr" (Schemelli #574; tune #41)
| 
| V Bc
| data-sort-value="000.39: 300a" | 39: 300
| data-sort-value="III/02 1: 241" | III/2.1: 180
| after Z 3342; text by Gerhardt?
| 
|- style="background: #E3F6CE;"
| data-sort-value="0490.000" | 490
| data-sort-value="307.020" | 6.
| data-sort-value="1735-12-31" | 1735–1736 or earlier
| song "Nur mein Jesus ist mein Leben" (Schemelli #700; tune #49)
| 
| V Bc
| data-sort-value="000.39: 300b" | 39: 300
| data-sort-value="III/02 1: 249" | III/2.1: 196
| after Z 8404c
| 
|- style="background: #E3F6CE;"
| data-sort-value="0491.000" | 491
| data-sort-value="307.021" | 6.
| data-sort-value="1735-12-31" | 1735–1736 or earlier
| song "O du Liebe meiner Liebe" (Schemelli #284; tune #20)
| 
| V Bc
| data-sort-value="000.39: 300c" | 39: 300
| data-sort-value="III/02 1: 220" | III/2.1: 140
| after Z 6693; text by 
| 
|- style="background: #E3F6CE;"
| data-sort-value="0492.000" | 492
| data-sort-value="307.022" | 6.
| data-sort-value="1735-12-31" | 1735–1736 or earlier
| song "O finstre Nacht, wenn wirst du doch vergehen" (Schemelli #891; tune #64)
| 
| V Bc
| data-sort-value="000.39: 301b" | 39: 301
| data-sort-value="III/02 1: 264" | III/2.1: 226
| ↔ Z 6171; text by 
| 
|- style="background: #E3F6CE;"
| data-sort-value="0493.000" | 493
| data-sort-value="307.023" | 6.
| data-sort-value="1735-12-31" | 1735–1736 or earlier
| song "O Jesulein süß, o Jesulein mild" (Schemelli #203; tune #16)
| 
| V Bc
| data-sort-value="000.39: 302a" | 39: 302
| data-sort-value="III/02 1: 216" | III/2.1: 132
| after Z 2016a; text by 
| 
|- style="background: #E3F6CE;"
| data-sort-value="0494.000" | 494
| data-sort-value="307.024" | 6.
| data-sort-value="1735-12-31" | 1735–1736 or earlier
| song "O liebe Seele, zieh die Sinnen" (Schemelli #575; tune #42)
| 
| V Bc
| data-sort-value="000.39: 302b" | 39: 302
| data-sort-value="III/02 1: 242" | III/2.1: 182
| → Z 7787
| 
|- style="background: #E3F6CE;"
| data-sort-value="0495.000" | 495
| data-sort-value="307.025" | 6.
| data-sort-value="1735-12-31" | 1735–1736 or earlier
| song "O wie selig seid ihr doch, ihr Frommen" (Schemelli #894; tune #65)
| 
| V Bc
| data-sort-value="000.39: 302c" | 39: 302
| data-sort-value="III/02 1: 265" | III/2.1: 228
| after Z 1583; ↔ BWV 405; text by Dach
| 
|- style="background: #E3F6CE;"
| data-sort-value="0496.000" | 496
| data-sort-value="307.026" | 6.
| data-sort-value="1735-12-31" | 1735–1736 or earlier
| song "Seelenbräutigam" (Schemelli #472; tune #35)
| 
| V Bc
| data-sort-value="000.39: 303b" | 39: 303
| data-sort-value="III/02 1: 235" | III/2.1: 168
| after Z 3255a–b; ↔ BWV 409; text by Drese
| 
|- style="background: #E3F6CE;"
| data-sort-value="0497.000" | 497
| data-sort-value="307.027" | 6.
| data-sort-value="1735-12-31" | 1735–1736 or earlier
| song "Seelenweide" (Schemelli #710; tune #50)
| 
| V Bc
| data-sort-value="000.39: 303c" | 39: 303
| data-sort-value="III/02 1: 250" | III/2.1: 198
| after Z 1286; text by Drese
| 
|- style="background: #E3F6CE;"
| data-sort-value="0499.000" | 499
| data-sort-value="308.002" | 6.
| data-sort-value="1735-12-31" | 1735–1736 or earlier
| song "Sei gegrüßet, Jesu gütig" (Schemelli #293; tune #22)
| 
| V Bc
| data-sort-value="000.39: 304b" | 39: 304
| data-sort-value="III/02 1: 222" | III/2.1: 143
| after Z 3889b; ↔ BWV 410; text by Keymann
| 
|- style="background: #E3F6CE;"
| data-sort-value="0498.000" | 498
| data-sort-value="308.008" | 6.
| data-sort-value="1735-12-31" | 1735–1736 or earlier
| song "Selig, wer an Jesum denkt" (Schemelli #292; tune #21)
| 
| V Bc
| data-sort-value="000.39: 304a" | 39: 304
| data-sort-value="III/02 1: 221" | III/2.1: 142
| → Z 4846
| 
|- style="background: #E3F6CE;"
| data-sort-value="0500.000" | 500
| data-sort-value="308.010" | 6.
| data-sort-value="1735-12-31" | 1735–1736 or earlier
| song "So gehst du nun, mein Jesu hin" (Schemelli #296; tune #23)
| 
| V Bc
| data-sort-value="000.39: 304c" | 39: 304
| data-sort-value="III/02 1: 223" | III/2.1: 144
| after Z 7631b; ↔ BWV 500a; text by 
| 
|- style="background: #E3F6CE;"
| data-sort-value="0501.000" | 501
| data-sort-value="308.012" | 6.
| data-sort-value="1735-12-31" | 1735–1736 or earlier
| song "So gibst du nun, mein Jesu, gute Nacht" (Schemelli #315; tune #26)
| 
| V Bc
| data-sort-value="000.39: 304d" | 39: 304
| data-sort-value="III/02 1: 226" | III/2.1: 150
| data-sort-value="after Z 0849; ↔ BWV 412" | after Z 849; ↔ BWV 412; text by 
| 
|- style="background: #E3F6CE;"
| data-sort-value="0502.000" | 502
| data-sort-value="308.013" | 6.
| data-sort-value="1735-12-31" | 1735–1736 or earlier
| song "So wünsch ich mir zu guter Letzt" (Schemelli #901; tune #66)
| 
| V Bc
| data-sort-value="000.39: 305a" | 39: 305
| data-sort-value="III/02 1: 266" | III/2.1: 230
| ↔ Z 5892; text by Rist
| 
|- style="background: #E3F6CE;"
| data-sort-value="0503.000" | 503
| data-sort-value="308.014" | 6.
| data-sort-value="1735-12-31" | 1735–1736 or earlier
| song "Steh ich bei meinem Gott" (Schemelli #945; tune #69)
| 
| V Bc
| data-sort-value="000.39: 305b" | 39: 305
| data-sort-value="III/02 1: 269" | III/2.1: 236
| after Z 5207; text by 
| 
|- style="background: #E3F6CE;"
| data-sort-value="0504.000" | 504
| data-sort-value="308.015" | 6.
| data-sort-value="1735-12-31" | 1735–1736 or earlier
| song "Vergiss mein nicht, dass ich dein nicht vergesse" (Schemelli #475; tune #36)
| 
| V Bc
| data-sort-value="000.39: 306a" | 39: 306
| data-sort-value="III/02 1: 236" | III/2.1: 170
| after Z 4779; text by Arnold
| 
|- style="background: #E3F6CE;"
| data-sort-value="0505.000" | 505
| data-sort-value="308.016" | 6.
| data-sort-value="1735-12-31" | 1735–1736 or earlier
| song "Vergiss mein nicht, ..., Mein allerliebster Gott" (Schemelli #627; tune #44)
| 
| V Bc
| data-sort-value="000.39: 306b" | 39: 306
| data-sort-value="III/02 1: 244" | III/2.1: 186
|  text by Arnold; → Z 4233
| 
|- style="background: #E3F6CE;"
| data-sort-value="0506.000" | 506
| data-sort-value="308.017" | 6.
| data-sort-value="1735-12-31" | 1735–1736 or earlier
| song "Was bist du doch, o Seele, so betrübt" (Schemelli #779; tune #55)
| A min.
| V Bc
| data-sort-value="000.39: 307b" | 39: 307
| data-sort-value="III/02 1: 255" | III/2.1: 208
| after Z 1837; ↔ BWV 424; text by 
| 
|- style="background: #E3F6CE;"
| data-sort-value="0507.000" | 507
| data-sort-value="308.018" | 6.
| data-sort-value="1735-12-31" | 1735–1736 or earlier
| song "Wo ist mein Schäflein, das ich liebe" (Schemelli #108; tune #6)
| 
| V Bc
| data-sort-value="000.39: 308" | 39: 308
| data-sort-value="III/02 1: 206" | III/2.1: 114
| after Z 5958a; text by 
| 
|- style="background: #F5F6CE;"
| data-sort-value="0508.000" | 508
| data-sort-value="309.001" | 6.
| data-sort-value="1735-07-01" | 1718-11-16 (GHS)after 1733–1734 (AMB)
| data-sort-value="Notebook A. M. Bach (1725) No. 25" | Notebook A. M. Bach (1725) No. 25: aria "Bist du bei mir"
| E♭ maj.
| V Bc
| data-sort-value="000.43 2: 036" | 432: 3639: 309
| data-sort-value="V/04: 102" | V/4: 102
| after Stölzel (Diomedes)
| 
|- style="background: #F5F6CE;"
| data-sort-value="0509.000" | 509
| data-sort-value="309.003" | 6.
| data-sort-value="1728-07-01" | 1725–1733 (AMB)
| data-sort-value="Notebook A. M. Bach (1725) No. 41" | Notebook A. M. Bach (1725) No. 41: aria "Gedenke doch, mein Geist, zurücke"
| 
| V Bc
| data-sort-value="000.43 2: 052" | 432: 5239: 310
| data-sort-value="V/04: 128" | V/4: 128
| 
| 
|- 
| data-sort-value="0510.000" | 510
| data-sort-value="309.004" | 6.
| data-sort-value="1728-07-01" | 1725–1733
| data-sort-value="Notebook A. M. Bach (1725) No. 12" | Notebook A. M. Bach (1725) No. 12: song "Gib dich zufrieden und sei stille"
| F maj.
| V Bc
| data-sort-value="000.43 2: 030" | 432: 3039: 311
| data-sort-value="V/04: 091" | V/4: 91
| 
| 
|- style="background: #E3F6CE;"
| data-sort-value="0511.000" | 511
| data-sort-value="309.005" | 6.
| data-sort-value="1728-07-01" | 1725–1733
| data-sort-value="Notebook A. M. Bach (1725) No. 13a" | Notebook A. M. Bach (1725) No. 13a: song "Gib dich zufrieden und sei stille"
| G min.
| V Bc
| data-sort-value="000.43 2: 031" | 432: 3139: 287
| data-sort-value="V/04: 091" | V/4: 91
| text by Gerhardt; → BWV 512
| 
|- style="background: #E3F6CE;"
| data-sort-value="0512.000" | 512
| data-sort-value="309.006" | 6.
| data-sort-value="1728-07-01" | 1725–1733
| data-sort-value="Notebook A. M. Bach (1725) No. 13b" | Notebook A. M. Bach (1725) No. 13b: song "Gib dich zufrieden und sei stille"
| E min.
| V Bc
| data-sort-value="000.43 2: 031" | 432: 3139: 287
| data-sort-value="V/04: 091" | V/4: 91
| data-sort-value="after BWV 0511; ↔ BWV 315" | after BWV 511; ↔ BWV 315, Z 7417a; text by Gerhardt 
| 
|- style="background: #F5F6CE;"
| data-sort-value="0513.000" | 513
| data-sort-value="309.007" | 6.
| data-sort-value="1728-07-01" | 1725–1733 (AMB)
| data-sort-value="Notebook A. M. Bach (1725) No. 42" | Notebook A. M. Bach (1725) No. 42: song "O Ewigkeit, du Donnerwort"
| 
| V Bc
| data-sort-value="000.43 2: 052" | 432: 5239: 301
| data-sort-value="V/04: 129" | V/4: 129
| data-sort-value="↔ BWV 0397" | ↔ BWV 397; text by Rist
| 
|- style="background: #F5F6CE;"
| data-sort-value="0514.000" | 514
| data-sort-value="309.008" | 6.
| data-sort-value="1728-07-01" | 1725–1733 (AMB)
| data-sort-value="Notebook A. M. Bach (1725) No. 35 | Notebook A. M. Bach (1725) No. 35: song "Schaffs mit mir, Gott"
| 
| V Bc
| data-sort-value="000.43 2: 048" | 432: 4839: 303
| data-sort-value="V/04: 125" | V/4: 125
| text by Schmolck
| 
|-
| data-sort-value="0515.000" | 515
| data-sort-value="309.009" | 6.
| data-sort-value="1735-07-01" | after 1733–1734
| data-sort-value="Notebook A. M. Bach (1725) No. 20a | Notebook A. M. Bach (1725) No. 20a: aria "So oft ich meine Tobackspfeife"
| D min.
| V Bc
| data-sort-value="000.43 2: 034" | 432: 34
| data-sort-value="V/04: 098" | V/4: 98
| by Bach, G. H.?; → BWV 515a
| 
|- style="background: #E3F6CE;"
| data-sort-value="0515.A00" | 515a
| data-sort-value="309.010" | 6.
| data-sort-value="1735-07-01" | after 1733–1734
| data-sort-value="Notebook A. M. Bach (1725) No. 20b | Notebook A. M. Bach (1725) No. 20b: aria "So oft ich meine Tobackspfeife"
| G min.
| V Bc
| data-sort-value="000.43 2: 034" | 432: 3439: 309
| data-sort-value="V/04: 098" | V/4: 98
| data-sort-value="after BWV 0515" | after BWV 515
| 
|- style="background: #F5F6CE;"
| data-sort-value="0516.000" | 516
| data-sort-value="309.011" | 6.
| data-sort-value="1735-07-01" | after 1733–1734 (AMB)
| data-sort-value="Notebook A. M. Bach (1725) No. 33 | Notebook A. M. Bach (1725) No. 33: aria "Warum betrübst du dich"
| 
| V Bc
| data-sort-value="000.43 2: 046" | 432: 4639: 307
| data-sort-value="V/04: 121" | V/4: 121
| 
| 
|- style="background: #F5F6CE;"
| data-sort-value="0517.000" | 517
| data-sort-value="309.012" | 6.
| data-sort-value="1735-07-01" | after 1733–1734 (AMB)
| data-sort-value="Notebook A. M. Bach (1725) No. 40 | Notebook A. M. Bach (1725) No. 40: song "Wie wohl ist mir, o Freund der Seelen"
| 
| V Bc
| data-sort-value="000.43 2: 051" | 432: 5139: 307
| data-sort-value="V/04: 128" | V/4: 128
| text by 
| 
|-
| data-sort-value="0518.000" | 518
| data-sort-value="309.013" | 6.
| data-sort-value="1738-12-31" | after 1725
| data-sort-value="Notebook A. M. Bach (1725) No. 37 | Notebook A. M. Bach (1725) No. 37: aria "Willst du dein Herz mir schenken" a.k.a. "Aria di G(i)ovannini"
| 
| V Bc
| data-sort-value="000.43 2: 049" | 432: 4939: 311
| data-sort-value="V/04: 126" | V/4: 126
| 
| 
|- style="background: #F6E3CE;"
| data-sort-value="0519.000" | 519
| data-sort-value="310.002" | 6.
| data-sort-value="1736-07-01" | 1736?
| Five Hymns from SBB Bach P 802 No. 1: "Hier lieg ich nun, o Vater aller Gnaden"
| 
| V Bc
| 
| 
| by Krebs, J. L.?; in Spitta III, pp. 401–403
| 
|- style="background: #F6E3CE;"
| data-sort-value="0520.000" | 520
| data-sort-value="310.003" | 6.
| data-sort-value="1736-07-01" | 1736?
| Five Hymns from SBB Bach P 802 No. 2: "Das walt mein Gott, Gott Vater, Sohn und heilger Geist"
| 
| V Bc
| 
| 
| by Krebs, J. L.?; in Spitta III, pp. 401–403
| 
|- style="background: #F6E3CE;"
| data-sort-value="0521.000" | 521
| data-sort-value="310.004" | 6.
| data-sort-value="1736-07-01" | 1736?
| Five Hymns from SBB Bach P 802 No. 3: "Gott, mein Herz dir Dank zusendet"
| 
| V
| 
| data-sort-value="III/03: 000" | III/3
| by Krebs, J. L.?; in Spitta III, pp. 401–403
| 
|- style="background: #F6E3CE;"
| data-sort-value="0522.000" | 522
| data-sort-value="310.005" | 6.
| data-sort-value="1736-07-01" | 1736?
| Five Hymns from SBB Bach P 802 No. 4: "Meine Seele, lass es gehen, wie es in der Welt jetzt geht"
| 
| V
| 
| 
| by Krebs, J. L.?; in Spitta III, pp. 401–403
| 
|- style="background: #F6E3CE;"
| data-sort-value="0523.000" | 523
| data-sort-value="310.006" | 6.
| data-sort-value="1736-07-01" | 1736?
| Five Hymns from SBB Bach P 802 No. 5: "Ich gnüge mich an meinem Stande"
| 
| V
| 
| 
| by Krebs, J. L.?; in Spitta III, pp. 401–403
| 
|- style="background: #E3F6CE;"
| data-sort-value="0524.000" | 524
| data-sort-value="310.007" | 6.
| data-sort-value="1707-09-15" | 1707 – July 1708
| Quodlibet (incomplete; wedding?)
| 
| data-sort-value="SATB Bc" | SATB (SBBB) Bc
| data-sort-value="000.82 2: 000" | NBG 322
| data-sort-value="I/41: 069" | I/41: 69
| 
| 
|}

Sacred songs and arias from Schemelli's Songbook (BWV 439–507)

The hymnal or song book known as Schemellis Gesangbuch, published 1736 in Leipzig by Georg Christian Schemelli, contained 954 hymns; 69 of these, listed here, were accompanied by a melody and a figured bass.
 BWV 439 – Ach, dass nicht die letzte Stunde
 BWV 440 – Auf, auf! die rechte Zeit ist hier
 BWV 441 – 
 BWV 442 – Beglückter Stand getreuer Seelen
 BWV 443 – Beschränkt, ihr Weisen dieser Welt
 BWV 444 – Brich entzwei, mein armes Herze
 BWV 445 – Brunnquell aller Güter
 BWV 446 – Der lieben Sonnen Licht und Pracht
 BWV 447 – Der Tag ist hin, die Sonne gehet nieder
 BWV 448 – Der Tag mit seinem Lichte
 BWV 449 – Dich bet' ich an, mein höchster Gott
 BWV 450 – Die bittre Leidenszeit beginnet abermal
 BWV 451 – Die güldne Sonne voll Freud und Wonne
 BWV 452 – Dir, dir Jehovah, will ich singen
 BWV 453 – Eins ist Not! ach Herr, dies Eine
 BWV 454 – Ermuntre dich, mein schwacher Geist
 BWV 455 – Erwürgtes Lamm, das die verwahrten Siegel
 BWV 456 – Es glänzet der Christen
 BWV 457 – Es ist nun aus mit meinem Leben
 BWV 458 – Es ist vollbracht! vergiss ja nicht
 BWV 459 – Es kostet viel, ein Christ zu sein
 BWV 460 – Gib dich zufrieden und sei stille
 BWV 461 – Gott lebet noch; Seele, was verzagst du doch?
 BWV 462 – Gott, wie groß ist deine Güte
 BWV 463 – Herr, nicht schicke deine Rache
 BWV 464 – Ich bin ja, Herr, in deiner Macht
 BWV 465 – Ich freue mich in dir
 BWV 466 – Ich halte treulich still und liebe
 BWV 467 – Ich lass' dich nicht
 BWV 468 – Ich liebe Jesum alle Stund'
 BWV 469 – Ich steh' an deiner Krippen hier
 BWV 470 – Jesu, Jesu, du bist mein
 BWV 471 – Jesu, deine Liebeswunden
 BWV 472 – Jesu, meines Glaubens Zier
 BWV 473 – Jesu, meines Herzens Freud
 BWV 474 – Jesus ist das schönste Licht
 BWV 475 – Jesus, unser Trost und Leben
 BWV 476 – Ihr Gestirn', ihr hohen Lufte
 BWV 477 – Kein Stündlein geht dahin
 BWV 478 – Komm, süßer Tod, komm, selge Ruh
 BWV 479 – Kommt, Seelen, dieser Tag
 BWV 480 – Kommt wieder aus der finstern Gruft
 BWV 481 – Lasset uns mit Jesu ziehen
 BWV 482 – Liebes Herz, bedenke doch
 BWV 483 – Liebster Gott, wann werd' ich sterben?
 BWV 484 – Liebster Herr Jesu! wo bleibest du so lange?
 BWV 485 – Liebster Immanuel, Herzog der Frommen
 BWV 486 – Mein Jesu, dem die Seraphinen
 BWV 487 – Mein Jesu! was für Seelenweh
 BWV 488 – Meines Lebens letzte Zeit
 BWV 489 – Nicht so traurig, nicht so sehr
 BWV 490 – Nur mein Jesus ist mein Leben
 BWV 491 – O du Liebe meiner Liebe
 BWV 492 – O finstre Nacht
 BWV 493 – O Jesulein süß, o Jesulein mild
 BWV 494 – O liebe Seele, zieh' die Sinnen
 BWV 495 – O wie selig seid ihr doch, ihr Frommen
 BWV 496 – Seelen-Bräutigam, Jesu, Gottes Lamm
 BWV 497 – Seelenweide, meine Freude
 BWV 498 – Selig, wer an Jesum denkt
 BWV 499 – Sei gegrüßet, Jesu gütig
 BWV 500 – So gehst du nun, mein Jesu, hin
 BWV 501 – So giebst du nun, mein Jesu, gute Nacht
 BWV 502 – So wünsch' ich mir zu guter Letzt
 BWV 503 – Steh' ich bei meinem Gott
 BWV 504 – Vergiss mein nicht, dass ich dein nicht
 BWV 505 – Vergiss mein nicht, vergiss mein nicht
 BWV 506 – Was bist du doch, o Seele, so betrübet
 BWV 507 – Wo ist mein Schäflein, das ich liebe

Songs and arias from the second Notebook for Anna Magdalena Bach (BWV 508–518)

 BWV 508 – Bist du bei mir (on a melody by Gottfried Heinrich Stölzel)
 BWV 509 – Gedenke doch, mein Geist, aria
 BWV 510 – Gib dich zufrieden, chorale
 BWV 511 – Gib dich zufrieden, chorale
 BWV 512 – Gib dich zufrieden, chorale
 BWV 513 – O Ewigkeit, du Donnerwort, chorale
 BWV 514 – Schaffs mit mir, Gott, chorale
 BWV 515 – So oft ich meine Tobackspfeife, aria
 BWV 515a – So oft ich meine Tobackspfeife
 BWV 516 – Warum betrübst du dich, aria
 BWV 517 – Wie wohl ist mir, o Freund der Seelen
 BWV 518 – Willst du dein Herz mir schenken

Five hymns from a manuscript by Johann Ludwig Krebs (BWV 519–523)
 are five hymns as collected by Johann Ludwig Krebs (1713–1780) and published by Breitkopf & Härtel in 1917.
 BWV 519 – Hier lieg ich nun
 BWV 520 – Das walt' mein Gott
 BWV 521 – Gott mein Herz dir Dank
 BWV 522 – Meine Seele, lass es gehen
 BWV 523 – Ich gnüge mich an meinem Stande

Quodlibet (BWV 524)
 BWV 524 – Wedding Quodlibet (fragment)

Added to the BWV catalogue in the 21st century (BWV 1127)
 BWV 1127 – "Alles mit Gott und nichts ohn' ihn" (strophic aria composed in Weimar in 1713, rediscovered in 2005)

Doubtful works from BWV Anh. II (BWV Anh. 32–41)
BWV Anh. II lists eight songs in Christian Hofmann von Hofmannswaldau's Deutsche Übersetzungen und Gedichte and two in Sperontes' Singende Muse an der Pleiße as possibly composed by Bach.

From Deutsche Übersetzungen und Gedichte

 BWV Anh. 32 – Sacred Song "Getrost mein Geist, wenn Wind und Wetter krachen" (doubtful)
 BWV Anh. 33 – Sacred song "Mein Jesus, spare nicht" (doubtful)
 BWV Anh. 34 – Sacred Song "Kann ich mit einem Tone" (doubtful)
 BWV Anh. 35 – Sacred Song "Meine Seele lass die Flügel" (doubtful)
 BWV Anh. 36 – Sacred song "Ich stimm' itzund ein Straff-Lied an" (doubtful)
 BWV Anh. 37 – Sacred song "Der schwarze Flügel trüber Nacht" (doubtful)
 BWV Anh. 38 – Sacred song "Das Finsterniß tritt ein" (doubtful)
 BWV Anh. 39 – Song "Ach was wollt ihr trüben Sinnen" (doubtful)

From Singende Muse an der Pleiße
 BWV Anh. 40 – Song  (Text lost; doubtful)
 BWV Anh. 41 – Song  (doubtful)

Spurious work from BWV Anh. III (BWV Anh. 158)
 BWV Anh. 158 – Aria "Andro dall' colle al prato", by Johann Christian Bach

Other BWV numbers referring to a single aria
In the church cantata range of BWV numbers (BWV 1–200):
 BWV 53 – "Schlage doch, gewünschte Stunde" (probably spurious, by Melchior Hoffmann)
 BWV 200 – "Bekennen will ich seinen Namen" (based on an aria included in Ein Lämmlein geht und trägt die Schuld, a passion-oratorio by Gottfried Heinrich Stölzel)

References

External links
 
Schemellis Gesangbuch BWV 439–507 with scores and videos for each song
(MP3) Bach Solo Songs, 27 November 2016: Devotional songs, as well as their counterparts in chorus, and classic Bach instrumentals at lottelehmannleague.org/singing-sins-archive (Hawaii Public Radio broadcast)

 
Bach
Songs and Arias by Johann Sebastian Bach, List of